The men's individual pursuit at the UEC European Track Championships was first competed in 2014 in Guadeloupe, France.

Medalists

References

 
Men's individual pursuit
Men's individual pursuit